Maksim Aleksandrovich Avramov (born 2 July 1987) is a former Russian professional football player.

Club career
He made his debut for FC Luch-Energiya Vladivostok on 2 July 2006 in a Russian Cup game against FC Dynamo Makhachkala.

He played in the Russian Football National League for FC Metallurg-Kuzbass Novokuznetsk in 2007.

External links
 
 

1987 births
Living people
Russian footballers
Association football defenders
FC Zenit-2 Saint Petersburg players
FC Luch Vladivostok players
FC Saturn Ramenskoye players
FC Novokuznetsk players